Monique Laederach (16 May 1938 – 17 March 2004) was a Swiss writer and translator.

The daughter of Jean-Rodolphe Laederach and Hilde Maeder, she was born in Les Brenets and studied music in Vienna, going on to pursue the study of literature at the University of Lausanne and the University of Neuchâtel. During this time, she also taught German. She published poems, novels, radio plays, plays for the theatre and literary criticism. Laederach also translated works by German-language writers such as Kafka, Rilke, Erika Burkart and Adolf Muschg into French.

From 1961 to 1973, she was married to the Swiss writer .

Laederach participated in literary conferences in Great Britain, Scandinavia, the United States, Canada and Mexico. She was a member of the Gruppe Olten.

A complete collection of her poems was published in 2003.

Laederach died in Peseux at the age of 65.

Selected works 
 L'Etain la source, poetry (1970)
 Pénélope, poetry (1971)
 La femme séparée, novel (1982)
 Trop petits pour Dieu, novel (1986)
 Les noces de Cana, novel (1996)
 Je n'ai pas dansé dans l'île, novel (2000)

References 

1938 births
2004 deaths
Swiss poets in French
Swiss women novelists
Swiss translators
20th-century translators
Swiss women poets
20th-century Swiss poets
20th-century Swiss novelists
21st-century Swiss novelists
21st-century Swiss women writers
20th-century Swiss women writers